Seneka Point (Russian: Mys Seneka) is a steep-to point in the western Sea of Okhotsk. It has sheer cliffs that are 152 m (500 ft) high and grayish-brown in color. It forms the eastern point of the entrance to Tugur Bay, the southeastern point of Lindholm Strait, and the western point of the entrance of Academy Bay; to its north lies Belichy Island. Numerous tide rips and eddies form near the point.

History

American whaleships cruised for bowhead whales off the point between 1855 and 1874. They called it Shantar Head or Walrus Point.

References

Headlands of Khabarovsk Krai